Kleinothraupis is a genus of  warbler-like birds in the tanager family Thraupidae. They are found in highland forest in South America.

Taxonomy and species list
The five species now placed in this genus were formerly assigned to the genus Hemispingus. A molecular phylogenetic study published in 2014 found that Hemispingus was polyphyletic. As part of the subsequent rearrangement, the five species were assigned to a new genus Kleinothraupis that was erected with the black-capped hemispingus as the type species. The name Kleinothraupis was chosen in honour of the ornithologist Nedra K. Klein whose name is combined with the Ancient Greek θραυπίς (thraupis), an unidentified small bird mentioned by Aristotle. In ornithology thraupis is used to signify a tanager. 

The five species in the genus are:

 Grey-capped hemispingus, Kleinothraupis reyi
 Black-capped hemispingus,	Kleinothraupis atropileus
 White-browed hemispingus,	Kleinothraupis auricularis
 Orange-browed hemispingus, Kleinothraupis calophrys
 Parodi's hemispingus, Kleinothraupis parodii

References

 
Bird genera
Taxa named by Kevin J. Burns (ornithologist)
Taxa named by Philip Unitt
Taxa named by Nicholas A. Mason